Christia obcordata is a flowering plant in the family Fabaceae. The plant is notable for its butterfly-shaped leaves. C. obcordata is used medicinally in Japan and Indonesia to treat urinary blockages. It was also evaluated as a means to treat malaria in 2007, but was found to be ineffective.

Alternative names 
Butterfly plant
Butterfly leaf
Iron butterfly
Butterfly stripe
Swallowtail

References 

Desmodieae
Flora of tropical Asia
Flora of China
Flora of Taiwan
Flora of Japan